The 2014 Asian Le Mans Series was the third season of the Automobile Club de l'Ouest's Asian Le Mans Series. It is the fourth 24 Hours of Le Mans-based series created by the ACO, following the American Le Mans Series (since merged with the Rolex Sports Car Series to form the United SportsCar Championship), the European Le Mans Series and the FIA World Endurance Championship. The four event season began at the Inje Speedium on 20 July 2014 and ended at Sepang International Circuit in Selangor on 7 December 2014.

In the main LMP2 class, defending champions OAK Racing Team Total won all four races during the season to win both championship titles on offer. David Cheng – who won the class title in 2013 – and Ho-Pin Tung won the drivers' championship title, and were joined by Keiko Ihara at Fuji and Yuan Bo at Sepang. Chang and Tung finished 53 points clear of John Hartshorne and Pu Jun Jin, who drove for Eurasia Motorsport. Similarly in the CN class, Craft-Bamboo Racing won all four races against class rivals Team Avelon Formula and ATL Wolf Asia. Kevin Tse was the only driver that was a part of the Craft-Bamboo Racing team at every meeting, and thus claimed the championship by 50 points ahead of Denis Lian, who took a trio of runner-up finishes with Team Avelon Formula. Tse was joined by Mathias Beche (Inje and Fuji), Frank Yu (Inje and Sepang), Samson Chan (Fuji and Shanghai), Naoki Yokomizo (Shanghai) and Jonathan Venter (Sepang) for his victories.

The GT class was the most competitive of the series, with three different entries sharing the four victories. Fuji winners Jun San Chen and Tatsuya Tanigawa, driving for the AAI-Rstrada team, were crowned champions by seven points ahead of teammates and Inje winners Hanchen Chen and Marco Seefried. Clearwater Racing won the final two races with Mok Weng Sun a part of both victories. He was joined by Keita Sawa and Matt Griffin in Shanghai, and Hiroshi Hamaguchi and Richard Wee in Sepang. Ryohei Sakaguchi (Inje) and Carlo van Dam (Fuji) were third drivers in the respective AAI-Rstrada winning cars. The GT-Am class saw just two entries, both at the Fuji event and both fielded by China's The Emperor Racing. One of the cars was withdrawn, and thus the sister car of Giorgio Sanna, Akihiko Nakaya – who was moved from the withdrawn car to replace Jiang Xin – and Max Wiser won the class.

Regulation changes
The top class of the series continued to be LMP2. The LMGTE and GTC categories were combined, along with Super GT GT300 class vehicles, into a single performance balanced GT category. Silver and bronze level drivers were required in the amateur division. A new class, replacing the LMPC category which was not utilized in 2013, allowed a variety of Group CN cars to compete with standardized Honda engines. These cars are eligible for competition through 2017.  At the end of the season, the first place team in LMP2 and the top two teams in GT received automatic invitations to the 2015 24 Hours of Le Mans.  The requirement for all competitors to have at least one driver from Asia was expanded to include any drivers from the Australasia region.  To help reduce operational costs for the teams, only two crew members were allowed to be involved in a tyre change.

Calendar
The 2014 calendar was revealed during the 2013 3 Hours of Sepang. The second round was to be held alongside the fifth round of the 2014 Super GT season at Fuji Speedway. After being removed from the provisional 2013 calendar the 3 Hours of Shanghai returned, racing at the same event alongside the tenth round of the 2014 World Touring Car Championship season. The season opening round at Inje Speedium was originally scheduled to be held on 6 July, but was later rescheduled to 20 July.

The schedule was revised again on 9 May with the round at Fuji being moved back three weeks and no longer on the same weekend as Super GT. As well as this, a round at the Buriram United International Circuit in Thailand was confirmed, replacing a round scheduled for the Zhuhai International Circuit. On 12 October, the round at the Buriram United International Circuit was removed from the calendar with no replacement.

Teams and Drivers
All entries use Michelin tyres.

LMP2

CN

GT

GT Am

Season results

Championship Standings

Scoring system

Teams Championships

LMP2 Standings

CN Standings

GT Standings

GT Am Standings

Driver's Championships

LMP2 Standings

CN Standings

GT Standings

GT Am Standings

References

External links
 

 
Asian Le Mans Series
Le Mans Series